Los Campitos is a neighbourhood of Todoque in La Palma, Canary Islands, Spain. Formerly it was a separate locality, integrated into Todoque in 2000. It was significantly affected by a lava flow from the 2021 Cumbre Vieja volcanic eruption, which destroyed hundreds of houses in the neighbourhood.

Description
Los Campitos is located at an altitude of 500 meters above sea level, five kilometers south of the urban area of Los Llanos de Aridane. It comprises the easternmost part of the town of Todoque, bordering Las Manchas on the south.

Agriculture of the area consisted of dryland farming and livestock farming. The settlements are scattered, with most building located next to Camino El Pastelero road, which runs from main part of Todoque in the west to the LP-2 main road (Carretera del Sur de La Palma), and next to the LP-2 road itself.

Los Campitos used to have a local one-room school, which was attended by children of the neighbourhood also the neighbourhood of El Paraíso in Las Manchas.

History
At the end of the 15th century, the place was part of the aboriginal canton of Tihuya. After the conquest and incorporation of the island to the Crown of Castile, the area came to be considered as communal land. According to Gaspar Frutuoso, the place was mainly dedicated to livestock, and its inhabitants were mainly descendants of the Palmerian aborigines, although there were also settlers of European origin.

In 1847, José María Wangüemert de Alcalá, a contributor to Pascual Madoz's geographic handbook, made a description of the Los Campitos settlement as having 69 houses and 263 inhabitants: 149 males and 114 females. It was also described that water was obtained at that time in Argual and Tazacorte as there were no ponds to collect winter water. The locality had 428 inhabitants in 1950 and 356 inhabitants in 1981.

Territory of the neighbourhood was strongly affected by the 2021 Cumbre Vieja volcanic eruption. The lava flows destroyed a large number of homes and buildings, including the school, practically erasing Los Campitos from the map.

See also
Todoque
La Laguna

References

Los Campitos
Los Campitos